The Bell Tower of Berlin Olympic Stadium was a  observation tower that was built in 1934 after plans by Professor Werner March. The steel skeleton construction was faced with dressed limestone. The tower is located at the western end of the Olympiastadion.

After the Second World War Soviet troops accidentally set the tower's contents on fire and it was no longer stable. Therefore, the British engineers blew it up in 1947. The Olympic Bell – weighing 9.60 tons, which had survived the fire and remained in its place in the tower – fell , cracked and has been unable to sound since then. In 1956 the bell was rescued, only in order to be used as a practice target using anti-tank ammunition. The old bell survives to this day and serves now as a memorial.

In it hangs the present Olympic Bell weighing 4.50 tons with the German Federal Eagle, the Brandenburg Gate and the texts between the Olympic Rings (in German language): "Olympic Games 1936" and "I call the youth of the world". The bell rings the note F sharp.

The tower is an important tourist destination offering a panorama of Berlin, Spandau, the Havel Valley, Potsdam, Nauen and Hennigsdorf.

See also 
 List of towers

External links 

 Homepages of the Olympic Bell Tower in Berlin

1936 Summer Olympics
Buildings and structures in Berlin
Observation towers in Berlin
Rebuilt buildings and structures in Berlin
Towers completed in 1934
Buildings and structures demolished in 1947
Towers completed in 1962
Demolished buildings and structures in Germany
1934 establishments in Germany